Girls' High School, Kandy is a national girls' school located in Kandy, Sri Lanka. It was founded in 1879 by Wesleyan Methodist missionaries and the oldest school for girls in Kandy affiliated with the Methodist Church in Sri Lanka.

History

Early years

In 1873, the need of a school in connection with Wesleyan Mission work was urged by Rev. Samuel Langdon and so a Day and Boarding school was built in Katukele, Kandy Sri Lanka.

The school was opened in 1879 at the Wesleyan school chapel adjoining the Girls' Boarding School, Katukele - Kandy, under the management of Mrs Langdon. Miss Payne, the next principal arrived in Colombo on 31 July 1879 but left the school in 1880. In May 1880 Miss Hay came from England and the school, which had 10 on the roll at its inception, increased to 70 and was registered to obtain a grant-in-aid from the government.

As numbers increased, in 1881 the school shifted to the more commodious precincts of the Mission in Brownrigg Street, but boarders remained at Katukele. Classes were held behind the church. Long desks and forms without backs and heavy pews from the church were moved weekly when classes had to take turn in writing. There were no games, Guiding, debating or netball, not even a library.

Since its inception the school has represented the ethnic diversity of Sri Lanka, with its student body consisting of Sinhalese, Tamils, Moors, Malays, Burghers and Chinese.

20th century

With the dawn of the 20th century, under the guidance of Miss Sansom, who served for 19 years, Kandy High School became one of the leading educational instructions in Ceylon. On 21 March 1917 the First Company of Girl Guides was formed in the Island. Miss Sansom prepared the way for this and Miss Jane Calveriey, the Vice-Principal was the First Captain. This was followed by the 1st Brownie Company and the Ranger Company in 1918 and 1921. In June 1920 a plague broke out in Kandy and 262 students were ordered to leave the premises overnight. The kindergarten and Std 2 shifted to Trinity College, Std 3 and 4 were housed at the YWCA opposite the police station and the senior girls at the YWCA near the Kandy lake. Miss. Calveriey had a busy time cycling from one place to another supervising the classes, so she invested in a scooter which made her day easier.
In 1917 the first company of Girl Guides was formed on the island, and the school was the first to play netball in Sri Lanka.

The four houses 
The four houses are Eaton, Langdon, Lawrance, and Sansom. Their respective house colours are, Light Blue, Dark Green, Yellow and Dark Blue .

Sports
The school's chess team has won considerable success in multiple achievements in both international, all-island and provincial tournaments. In 2013, school won the All Island under 15 'B' Division Badminton Championship for the Janaka Bogollagama Memorial Shield. In the same year, they became the champions in chess for the fourth successive year at the All-Island Schools Chess Championship. In 2017, The Under 11 chess team became the champions of the Under 11 Girls’ (‘A’ Division) event at the All- Island Chess festival for the second consecutive time. In 2014 the team became all-island champions of their respective under 9 age category.

In 2011, they won the Central Province Schools under 19 Table Tennis, Volleyball (under 19) Championships and under 14 and under 15 'Milo' netball titles in tournaments organised by the Central Province Education Department. In 2018, the girls won Under 18 Provincial Netball Championship. In 2019, girls won several events at the Junior Nationals, Sir John Tarbat Senior Athletic Championship and All Island Relay Championship.

The school has produced several notable netball players to national team such as Maheesha Bandara, Venuki Boyagoda, Faika Feroze and Yohani Nilupuli de Silva.

Past principals
S. Langdon was the first principal of the school who had the tenure from 1879 to 1880. R. Allen was the last Methodist principal. In 1945, Grace Paul became the first Sri Lankan principal in the school’s history. In 1964, Hema Jayasinghe became the first old girl to become the principal of the school.

Notable alumni

Jean Arasanayagam - an English-language poet and fiction writer.
Irangani Serasinghe - a Sri Lankan actress.
Sanoja Bibile - a Sri Lankan actress

References

External links
Girls' High School, Kandy: Homepage

1879 establishments in Ceylon
Educational institutions established in 1879
Girls' schools in Sri Lanka
Schools in Kandy